Nassarius thachi is a species of sea snail, a marine gastropod mollusk in the family Nassariidae, the nassa mud snails or dog whelks.

Description
The shell grows to a length of 30 mm.

Distribution
This species occurs in the tropical Western Pacific off China, Taiwan, Vietnam, Indonesia, Fiji.

References

 Cernohorsky, W.O., 1984 [31/Dec/1984].Systematics of the family Nassariidae (Mollusca: Gastropoda). Bulletin of the Auckland Institute and Museum, 14:0–0.
 Bouchet, P.; Fontaine, B. (2009). List of new marine species described between 2002-2006. Census of Marine Life.

External links
 

Nassariidae
Gastropods described in 2004